Kreß may refer to:
 Hermann Kreß (1895–1943), German general
 Willibald Kreß (1906–1989), German footballer
 members of the patrician family Kreß von Kressenstein
 Franz Freiherr Kreß von Kressenstein (1881–1957), German general
 Friedrich Freiherr Kreß von Kressenstein (1870–1948), German general
 Georg Ludwig Kreß von Kressenstein (1797–1877), Bavarian artist
 Gustav Kreß von Kressenstein (1838–1898), Bavarian artist
 Otto Freiherr Kreß von Kressenstein (1850–1929), Bavarian general and War Minister

See also 
 Kress (disambiguation)